This is a list of flag bearers who have represented Ecuador at the Olympics.

Flag bearers carry the national flag of their country at the opening ceremony of the Olympic Games.

See also
Ecuador at the Olympics

References

Ecuador at the Olympics
Ecuador
Olympic flagbearers